Page One is an album by Steven Page, released by Anthem Records on 19 October 2010. It is his first solo album of original material since departing Barenaked Ladies in February 2009.

Page One includes seven songs composed by Page with longtime collaborator Stephen Duffy and a pair of songs with first-time collaborator Craig Northey. The remaining three songs were composed solely by Page.

Singles
The first single was "Indecision", released on 27 July 2010; the single peaked at No. 25 on the Billboard Adult Alternative Songs chart. The music video debuted on 9 October 2010.
The second single was "Over Joy". No video was made for the song.

Commercial performance

Page One peaked at No. 58 on the Canadian Albums Chart. It did not make the Billboard 200 chart in the United States; however, it did peak at No. 6 on the Heatseekers Albums Chart. It also finished in third place on CBC Radio 2's "Top Canadian Albums of 2010", as voted by the station's listeners.

Track listing

Personnel
Steven Page – vocals, guitar, keyboards, glockenspiel, percussion
John Fields – bass guitar, guitar, keyboards, programming, drums, accordion, mandolin
Additional personnel
Bryden Baird – flugelhorn on 6; Flugelhorn, trumpet, piano, glockenspiel on 12
Jay Baird – bass on 12; Clarinet on 6
Jesse Baird – Eb horn on 6; Drums, percussion on 12
Ken Chastain – percussion, programing, special effects
Dorian Crozier – drums on 5 and 9
Esthero – vocals on 2 and 4
Kevin Fox – cello
Brian Gallagher – flute on 2; clarinet on 4
Karen Graves – violin, flute
Stephen Lu – orchestral arrangement, keyboards on 1
Christine Munn – vocals on 3 and 9
Will Owsley – pedal steel on 3 and 10
Glen Phillips – vocals on 8
Tim Pierce – guitar on 2 and 3; Banjo on 3
Pete Thomas – drums, percussion
Michael Nelson – horn arrangement, trombone on 10
Kenni Holmen – tenor sax, flute on 10
Steve Strand – trumpet on 10
Dave Jensen – trumpet on 10
Kathy Jensen – baritone sax on 10

Production
Producers: John Fields, Steven Page
Recording: John Fields (tracks 1-5, 7-11), Vic Florencia (tracks 6 and 12)
Assistant engineering: C. Todd Nelson
Mixing: Paul David Hager, John Fields
Additional recording: Steven Page
Mastering: Dave McNair
Art direction/Design: re:form
Concept/Illustrations: Olly Moss
Cover photography: David Bergman
Booklet photography: Valerie Joidon-Keaton
Management: Ray Danniels

Singles

References

2010 albums
Steven Page albums